The 2019 America East men's soccer tournament was the 31st edition of the tournament. The tournament decided the America East Conference champion and guaranteed representative into the 2019 NCAA Division I men's soccer tournament.  The tournament began on November 9 and concluded on November 16.

Defending champion, New Hampshire, was the number one seed coming into the tournament. Both New Hampshire and Vermont were statistically tied for first place in the conference. New Hampshire broke the tie by defeating Hartford twice, while Vermont split their games with Hartford. New Hampshire was seeking a consecutive tournament win since UMBC 2013-2015 seasons. In the final round of the tournament, New Hampshire played #3 seed Hartford, and the first and only goal of the game was kicked in by New Hampshire 3:27 into the game. This was New Hampshire's second America East conference title in school history. 

New Hampshire was the conference's lone bid into the NCAA Tournament. They hosted Fairleigh-Dickinson in the first round, defeating Fairleigh-Dickinson 1-0 at home. They would then travel to 10 seed #13 Virginia Tech where they fell 1-4. This was New Hampshire's fourth appearance in NCAA Men's Soccer Tournament. New Hampshire finished the season nationally ranked 22nd by the United Soccer Coaches.

Seeds

Bracket

Results

Quarterfinals

Semifinals

Final

Awards and honors 

 Tournament MVP: Josh Bauer, New Hampshire

All-Tournament team:

 Reide Conde, Albany
 Andrew McDonnell, Binghamton
 Alejandro Osorio, UMass-Lowell
 Patrik Gujic, UMass-Lowell
 Garrett Lillie, Vermont
 Jon Arnar-Barodal, Vermont

 Altor Elena, Hartford
 Sergi Martinez, Hartford
 Jimmy Slayton, Hartford
 Josh Bauer, New Hampshire
 Antonio Colacci, New Hampshire
 Rory O'Driscoll, New Hampshire
 Jonny Wolf, New Hampshire

See also 
 2019 America East Conference Women's Soccer Tournament

References

External links 
 2019 A-East Men's Soccer Championship Central

America East Conference Men's Soccer Tournament
America East Men's Soccer
America East Men's Soccer
America East Men's Soccer
America East Men's Soccer
America East Men's Soccer Tournament